Crescent (also Crescent Station) is an unincorporated community and census-designated place (CDP) in McIntosh County, Georgia, United States. It has a post office with the ZIP code 31304.

It was first listed as a CDP in the 2020 census with a population of 838.

History
A post office called Crescent has been in operation since 1890. The community was named after the crescent shape of a nearby coastal inlet.

Demographics

2020 census

Note: the US Census treats Hispanic/Latino as an ethnic category. This table excludes Latinos from the racial categories and assigns them to a separate category. Hispanics/Latinos can be of any race.

References

Unincorporated communities in McIntosh County, Georgia
Census-designated places in McIntosh County, Georgia